This is a list of notable people with the surname Saini.

Armed Forces
Saini caste of punjab state had won two Paramvir Chakra 21 soldiers have been awarded this highest gallantry award in India.Out of which 20 were from the Indian Army and one from the Air force.
Joginder Singh (Param Vir Chakra) 
Gurmukh Singh (First World War)
Gurbachan Singh Salaria (Param Vir Chakra)
 Ravneet Singh (Current Deputy Chief of the Naval Staff)
Satinder Kumar Saini (41st Vice chief of Army Staff) 
Krishan Kant Saini (World record in helicopter avionics by accomplishing the world's highest altitude(22,500m) helicopter landing,also a distinguished officer of Indian Air Force, later on Managing Director of Pawan Hans

Indian National Freedom Movement
Gurdan Saini (Rajput General- died in Ranthambore also known as Rana Gurdan Saini)
 Harnam Singh Saini (Ghadar movement, died - hanged on March 16, 1917 after Lahore Conspiracy Case trial)
 Nanu Singh Saini
 Maya Singh Saini
 Gulab Singh Saini
 Sharan Kaur Pabla
 Sukhdev Singh Sukha
Sangat Singh Saini (General in the army of Maharaja Ranjit Singh in the Sikh Empire, also rewarded 300 acres land for bravery in battle)
Ajit Saini of Punjab, India (Freedom fighter and an acclaimed writer and columnist, also a close lieutenant of Subhas Chandra Bose)

Religious and Political Leaders

 Labh Singh Saini (Akali dal president)
Jathedar Sadhu Singh Bhaura (Akal Takht Jathedar)
Nanua Bairagi Baptised Sikh of 17th Century and close associate of Sikh Gurus.
Dr. Dharam Singh Saini [4 times MLA from Uttar Pradesh and Current Minister Of State (Independent Charge) of Ayush, Food Security and Drug Administration(MOS)]
Madan Lal Saini (Former Member of parliament in the Rajya Sabha and Former President of BJP Rajasthan until his death) 
 Raj Saini MP (Canadian Politician elected to represent the riding in Kitchener Centre in the House of Commons of Canada in the 2015 Canadian federal election) 
 Satyapal Singh Saini (Vice President of BJP Uttar Pradesh and Former Member of parliament of 16th Lok Sabha for Sambhal)
 Nayab Singh Saini (Current Member of parliament of 17th Lok Sabha for Kurukshetra, Haryana) 
 Angad Singh Saini (One of the youngest MLA of Punjab Legislative Assembly election, 2017) 
 Prabhu Lal Saini (Former Cabinet Minister in the Government of Rajasthan led by Vasundhara Raje)
 Dr. Kalpana Saini (President of backward Commission of Uttarakhand government)
Rajkumar Saini (Former MP of Kurukshetra of 16th Lok Sabha)

Artists
Emily Lloyd-Saini British actress, writer and comedienne
Nek Chand Saini (Padma Shri for Rock Garden)
Shiwani Saini (Actress) 
Flora Saini (Actress) 
Tarsame Singh Saini (British singer,composer and actor of Indian descent) 
 Naveen Saini (Indian television Actor)

Civilians with Titles
 Sadhu Ram Chaudhari (OBE) 
 Chaudhary Dewan Chand Saini (Rai Bahadur)
 Chaudhari Nand Ram Saini (Zaildar from Hissar Division)
 Sardar Nanu Singh Saini(Sikh army General and well Known Jagirdar in Phulkian Rayast)
 Surrendar Saini (Padma Bhushan), Indian social worker, chairperson of the Bhavan Institute of Indian Art and Culture, Member of the committee set up by the Ministry of Social Justice and Empowerment in 1999)
 Dharampal Saini (Padma Shri), In 2021, Saini played a key role in securing the release of a COBRA commando Rakeshwar Singh Manhas from Naxalists post 2021 Sukma-Bijapur attack)

Journalists and Scholars
Angela Saini (British Science journalist, author of books such as Superior: The Return of Race Science and also a presenter on BBC Radio) 
Dr. Pritam Saini (Punjabi journalist, literary critic, history scholar and also served as Research Fellow at Punjabi University, Patiala in Punjab, India
 Swati Maria Saini (Financial Journalist and Hong Kong based reporter for Bloomberg Television and also interned for CNBC and TheStreet)

Science and Medicine
Deep Saini (Scientist, Current President and Vice-chancellor of Dalhousie University) 
Dr. Subhash Saini (Senior Computer scientist at NASA) 
Avtar Saini (Microprocessor designer and developer and former director for Intel's South Asia division) 
Sanjay Saini (Radiologist at Harvard Medical School, currently professor of Radiology at Harvard Medical School and Vice Chairman for Finance, Department of Radiology, at Massachusetts General Hospital, MA, USA

Sports
Sandeep Singh (Flicker Singh)
Baljit Singh Saini (Asian Gold Medalist and Olympian of field hockey) 
Ashbeer Saini
Nirmal Saini (former captain of the India women's national volleyball team) 
 Navdeep Saini (Indian cricketer)
Kajal Saini
Nitin Saini
 Vikas Singh Saini
 Aman Saini (Silver Medalist at Asian Games 2018 in archery)
 Saini Sisters (Rupa Saini, Krishna Saini, Swarna Saini and Prema Saini at one time the Saini Sisters dominated woman's field hockey in India) 
 Kulbir Bhaura of Jalandhar, Punjab (British former field hockey player, a member of the gold winning squad at 1988 Summer Olympics and Bronze medal at 1984 Summer Olympics)
 Rupa Kumari Saini (Indian field hockey player of 1980 Summer Olympics)
 Balwant (Bal) Singh Saini (former British field hockey international player of Indian descent)
 Parminder Singh Saini (field hockey) (Kenyan Field hockey player of 1984 Summer Olympics and 1988 Summer Olympics)

Business and Entrepreneurship
Harindarpal Banga (Indian billionaire, entrepreneur and philanthropist)
 Ajay Banga (Padma Shri, Executive chairman of Mastercard, previously served as president and CEO of the company from July 2010 until December 31, 2020)
 M S Banga (Indian businessman, philanthropist and a senior partner at the Clayton, Dubilier & Rice)
 Jessie Singh Saini (American industrialist of Indian descent, founder of BJS Electronics)

Other Notabilities
Sumedh Singh Saini (former Director general of police of Punjab, India
 Montu Saini (former Executive chef to the President of India in the Rashtrapati Bhavan) 
 Pawan Saini (doctor, politician, social activist, also a lead member of various academic institutions namely Saini Public school & Gita Niketan Educational society)
 Virendra Saini (double National Film Award winner, one of the 24 reputed filmmakers who returned their National Film Awards in protest against the government)
 Indu Banga (Indian historian specializes in the history of Punjab)
 Attar Singh Saini (cinematographer in the Indian film industry for the last two decades and also the jury member for Indian Television Academy Awards 2004 and 2009) 
 Shree Saini from Punjab, India (Indian-American model, motivational speaker and current Miss Washington World)

References